Norwalk Transit may refer to one of two transit agencies in the United States serving different cities named Norwalk:

Norwalk Transit District, serving Norwalk, Connecticut, and surrounding communities
Norwalk Transit (California), serving Norwalk, California, and also operates in portions of Artesia, Bellflower, Cerritos, Industry, La Mirada and Whittier in Southeast Los Angeles County